Ewa Zielińska (born 25 December 1972) is a Paralympian athlete from Poland competing mainly in category F42 long jump and T42 sprint events.

She competed in the women's F42 long jump at the 2004 Summer Paralympics in Athens, Greece, but failed to win a medal. She improved in the 2008 Summer Paralympics in Beijing, China, where she won a bronze medal in the women's F42 long jump event, but failed to win a medal in the T42 100m.

External links
 Profile at Polish Paralympic Committee
 

Living people
Place of birth missing (living people)
1972 births
Paralympic athletes of Poland
Athletes (track and field) at the 2004 Summer Paralympics
Athletes (track and field) at the 2008 Summer Paralympics
Paralympic bronze medalists for Poland
Polish amputees
Medalists at the 2008 Summer Paralympics
Medalists at the World Para Athletics European Championships
Paralympic medalists in athletics (track and field)
Polish female sprinters
Polish female long jumpers
Sprinters with limb difference
Long jumpers with limb difference
Paralympic sprinters
Paralympic long jumpers